Chaetostoma chimu is a species of catfish in the family Loricariidae. It is native to South America, where it occurs in the Andean foothills of the Orinoco basin in Colombia. It was described in 2020 by Alexander Urbano-Bonilla and Gustavo A. Ballen on the basis of the distinctive morphology and coloration of the 119 specimens examined. FishBase does not list this species.

References 

chimu
Fish described in 2020